The Fort São José of Ibo (Fortim de São José do Ibo in Portuguese) is one of the three forts built by the Portugal on Ibo Island, Cabo Delgado Province in Mozambique.

History
It was the first fort to be built on Ibo Island, in 1764, to defend the Portuguese settlers and their trade from French, English or Madagascar pirates, and it is located by the islands harbour. Initially named Fort Santa Bárbara by governor Caetano Alberto Júdice who had it built, by 1809 it became known as São José.

It lost its military function when the fort São João Baptista was built in 1791. 

The fort has an approximately rectangular plan, containing the troops' barracks and warehouse, and it was equipped with seven small-caliber iron guns. The corners facing the sea being surmounted by watchhouses. It was restored in 1945 by the Mozambican Historical Monuments and Relics Commission, demolishing the buildings that had been erected between 1899 and 1900 that had de-characterized it.

See also
 Portuguese Mozambique
 Quirimbas Islands

References

18th-century fortifications
Forts in Mozambique
Portuguese forts
Buildings and structures in Cabo Delgado Province
Tourist attractions in Cabo Delgado Province
Portuguese colonial architecture in Mozambique